"Grace" is the first single by American Christian and gospel singer Phil Wickham from his debut album Phil Wickham.

Background

Reception

Critical response
The lead single "Grace" has received positive reviews from the critics:

"The first single, "Grace" serves as a desperate plea to God for His grace to cover humanity and also sets the incredibly emotional tone for the rest of the disc. While there is not a definite theme that runs throughout the album, haunting melodies, with Wickham’s unforgettable vocals, make stand-out cuts such as “Mystery” and “I Adore You” sound both magical and intense." CCM Magazine. 

"In a beautiful combination of melody and lyrics, "Grace" fully expresses the pain and darkness of the valleys we all experience. He calls grace out by name, referring to God, and asks for guidance and direction through those hard times in life.' -Associated Content

""Grace" is receiving early praise for its modern-sounding melody woven with Wickham's soaring vocals, which are reminiscent of mainstream acts like Jeff Buckley and Travis." -SongTouch.com 

"Songs like "Grace", "Cannons" and "Desire" give us a good example of how talented he is, and especially how passionate is for God." -Christian Rock Rocks 

"..."Grace" speak of longing and crashing symbols of gentleness." -Soul Shine 

"Maybe it’s his unique vocals, maybe it’s the ethereal chorus work, immediately distinctive in opener "Grace"." -Christian Music About

References

2006 singles
Gospel songs
2006 songs
Phil Wickham songs
Songs written by Phil Wickham